Johnson Kubisa (born 23 April 1972) is a Botswanan sprinter who specializes in the 400 metres.

He was a member of the Botswana 4 x 400 metres relay team that finished eighth at the 2004 Olympic Games. He also helped win this event at the 2003 All-Africa Games in a national record time of 3:02.24 minutes, together with teammates California Molefe, Kagiso Kilego and Oganeditse Moseki. 

On the individual level, Kubisa finished seventh at the 2002 African Championships and won a bronze medal at the 2003 Military World Games. Participating in the 2000 Summer Olympics, he achieved seventh place in his heat, thus failing to make it through to the second round.

See also
Botswana at the 2003 All-Africa Games
Botswana at the 2004 Summer Olympics

External links
 

1972 births
Living people
Botswana male sprinters
Athletes (track and field) at the 1996 Summer Olympics
Athletes (track and field) at the 1998 Commonwealth Games
Athletes (track and field) at the 2000 Summer Olympics
Athletes (track and field) at the 2002 Commonwealth Games
Athletes (track and field) at the 2004 Summer Olympics
Athletes (track and field) at the 2006 Commonwealth Games
Olympic athletes of Botswana
Commonwealth Games competitors for Botswana
African Games gold medalists for Botswana
African Games medalists in athletics (track and field)
Athletes (track and field) at the 2003 All-Africa Games